Ali Ouattara Issouf (born 25 October 1997) is a Ghanaian professional footballer who plays as defender for Ghana Premier League side Medeama S.C. He previously featured for Real Tamale United.

Club career

Real Tamale United 
Ouattara played for lower-tier side Real Tamale United in the Ghana Division One League before moving to Medeama SC in 2018.

Medeama SC 
In February 2018, he signed for Medeama SC on a two-year deal. On 28 February 2018, he was unveiled along with 10 other players including Bright Enchil, Richard Boadu and Ebenezer Ackahbi as the new signings for the Medeama SC ahead of the 2018 Ghana Premier League.

During that season, he made 14 league appearances before the league was abandoned due to the dissolution of the Ghana Football Association (GFA) in June 2018, as a result of the Anas Number 12 Expose.

Due to injury problems, in the 2019–20 Ghana Premier League season, he played 4 league matches before the league was cancelled as a result of the COVID-19 pandemic.

In September 2020, he signed a new contract with the club after initial contract expired, signing two-year deal to keep him at Tarkwa  until 2022. He was acknowledged by club coach Samuel Boadu for having fantastic attributes required to stay at the top league in the football scene.

In March 2021, Ouattara and Bright Enchil were suspended for an upcoming Berekum Chelsea match, after picking accumulated number of yellow cards. The two joined Medeama in 2018, and since then became a key defensive duo for the Tarkwa-based side. In November 2020, at the early stages of the season he picked up an injury but he was later declared fit for a match against Legon Cities.

International career 
Ouattara was called up to the Ghana national under-23 football team in August 2019 by coach Ibrahim Tanko ahead of a two legged 2019 Africa U-23 Cup of Nations final round qualifiers against Algeria.

References

External links 

 

Living people
1997 births
Association football defenders
Ghanaian footballers
Real Tamale United players
Medeama SC players
Ghana Premier League players